Dos amores un amante (English Two loves one lover) is the 20th studio album by the Mexican pop singer, Ana Gabriel. It was released in 2005. It was produced by herself. It was nominated in the category of Female Latin Pop Album Of The Year in the Latin Billboard Music Awards of 2007, but lost to Paulina Rubio's Ananda.

Track listing
Tracks:
 Olvídate de Ellos 03:40
 Desahogo - Erasmo Carlos / Roberto Carlos 03:16
 La Farsante - Juan Gabriel 03:17
 Te Llegará Mi Olvido - Juan Gabriel 02:24
 Sin Tu Amor 04:01
 La Distancia - Erasmo Carlos / Roberto Carlos 03:41
 Aprendiste a Volar 02:54
 Las Llaves de Mi Alma - Vicente Fernández 02:47
 Debo Hacerlo - Juan Gabriel 04:28
 Qué Será de Ti  - Antonio Marcos / M. Marcos03:26 deluxe
 Por Tu Maldito Amor 03:43
 Siete Veces Siete Más 02:51
 Qué Será de Ti 03:26

Album charts

 Note: This release reached the #8 position in Billboard Latin Pop Albums staying for 16 weeks  and it reached the #22 position in the Billboard Top Latin Albums staying for 11 weeks in the chart.

Singles
 Sin Tu Amor
 Olvidate de Ellos

Singles charts
"Sin tu amor" reaheced #39 on Hot Latin Songs and #10 on Latin Pop Airplay.

Sales and certifications

Awards and nominations

References

2005 albums
Ana Gabriel albums